This article shows Sporting Clube de Portugal's player statistics and all matches that the club played during the 2015–16 season.

Pre-season and friendlies

Competitions

Overall record

Supertaça Cândido de Oliveira

Primeira Liga

League table

Results by round

Matches

Taça de Portugal

Third round

Fourth round

Fifth round

Taça da Liga

Third round

UEFA Champions League

Play-off round

UEFA Europa League

Group stage

Round of 32

Squad statistics

Players

Current squad

Transfers

In

 End of contract

Out

 End of contract

References

External links
 Official club website 

Sporting CP seasons
Sporting
Sporting Lisbon